Grzmiączka  (German Gramenzer Busch) is a settlement in the administrative district of Gmina Grzmiąca, within Szczecinek County, West Pomeranian Voivodeship, in northwestern Poland.

For the history of the region, see History of Pomerania.

References

Villages in Szczecinek County